Kaiden Guhle (born January 18, 2002) is a Canadian ice hockey defenceman currently playing for the Montreal Canadiens of the National Hockey League (NHL). He was drafted 16th overall by the Canadiens in the 2020 NHL Entry Draft.

Early life
Guhle was born on January 18, 2002, in Sherwood Park, Alberta, Canada to parents Carrianne and Mark. He was born into an athletic family; his mother was a figure skater, his father played basketball, and his older brother Brendan Guhle is a professional ice hockey player. As a result, the Guhle brothers began power skating at a young age.

Playing career

Amateur

Prince Albert Raiders (2017–21)
Guhle was selected with the first overall pick in the 2017 WHL draft by the Prince Albert Raiders. In his first full season with the Raiders, the team won Ed Chynoweth Cup as the finals champion of the WHL. They played in the 2019 Memorial Cup, but did not advance out of the round-robin. During the 2019–20 season, he had 40 points in 64 games.

On October 6, 2020, Guhle was selected by the Montreal Canadiens in the first round, 16th overall, at the 2020 NHL Entry Draft. He was later signed to a three-year, entry-level contract with the Canadiens on October 21, 2020, which included bonuses to a maximum of $420,000 in each season. However, in November he was loaned to the Brooks Bandits of the Alberta Junior Hockey League until December 20.

With the COVID-19 pandemic resulting in the 2020–21 WHL season being reduced and delayed, Guhle began the season playing three games with the Laval Rocket in the AHL before joining the Canadian junior national team preparations. Due to a subsequent hand injury, he played only two games with the Raiders in the WHL, before resuming full training in June of 2021.

Guhle made a strong impression at the Canadiens' training camp prior to the 2021–22 NHL season, and as a result coach Dominique Ducharme seriously weighed retaining him in the lineup, though noting it would not make sense to do so unless there was a regular place for him in the top six. Guhle himself said that he had not expected to still be in consideration a day before the roster announcement. Ultimately he was not taken up, and returned to Prince Albert for the 2021–22 season. Guhle played seventeen games with the Raiders, registering 2 goals and 13 assists, before being traded to the Edmonton Oil Kings on December 1.

Edmonton Oil Kings (2021–22)
The trade was part of the Oil Kings' bid to challenge the Winnipeg Ice for the WHL championship title. Guhle record five goals and twenty assists in 25 regular season games with the Oil Kings, and was named the WHL Central Division's defenceman of the year. After missing the final weeks of the regular season due to injury, he returned for the first game of the 2022 WHL playoffs, and scored three goals and two assists in the Oil Kings' four-game sweep of the Lethbridge Hurricanes in the quarterfinals. The Oil Kings also swept the Red Deer Rebels in the second round, before winning the matchup with the Ice in the WHL Eastern Conference Final 4 games to 1. Guhle scored two goals and an assist in the series-clinching Game 5 win. They went on to face the Seattle Thunderbirds in the WHL Finals, winning four games to two, the second Chynoweth Cup win of Guhle's career. He was named the WHL Playoff Most Valuable Player at the conclusion of the series, setting a team record for most goals by a defenceman in a single postseason (8). The Oil Kings played in the 2022 Memorial Cup, but did not advance past the round robin.

Professional

Montreal Canadiens (2022–present)
Following the conclusion of the Memorial Cup, Guhle began to rehabilitate a lower body injury that he had been playing through during the playoff run. As a result of this he did not participate in the team's development camp in July. He said that he "wanted to make sure that I was ready because there's a long season coming up. Hopefully, my first professional season." Participating in pre-season games, Guhle was widely considered one of the most impressive young players in the Canadiens system, and was a perceived frontrunner to make the team's defensive lineup. He scored three goals in the pre-season. On October 10, it was confirmed that Guhle had made the Canadiens' opening night roster for the regular season. In his NHL debut on October 12, 2022, Guhle played a team-leading 22:34 minutes of ice time in a 4–3 victory over the Toronto Maple Leafs. With injuries to the team's more senior left-side defencemen, Mike Matheson and Joel Edmundson, Guhle continued to play top-line minutes for the Canadiens. He recorded his first NHL points, two assists, in a 3–2 victory over the Pittsburgh Penguins on October 17, and was named the second star of the game. Guhle scored his first NHL goal in an October 27 3–2 victory over the Buffalo Sabres, helping the team to its first road victory of the season. After he sustained a knee injury in a December 29, 2022 game against the Florida Panthers where he collided with Panthers forward Aleksander Barkov, it was announced that Guhle would miss at least two months of the remainder of the season. He returned to the team on February 28, scoring a goal in a 3–1 win over the San Jose Sharks.

International play

 

On November 3, 2018, Guhle was named captain of Team Canada Red at the 2018 World U-17 Hockey Challenge. Following this, he was selected to join the Canada men's national junior ice hockey team at the 2021 World Junior Championships. He finished the World Juniors with two goals and an assist in seven games as the team earned a silver medal following a loss to the United States. The following year, Guhle was named captain of the Canadian team for the 2022 World Junior Championships. After playing two games, the tournament was cancelled as a result of Omicron variant spread. Guhle said it was a disappointment given it being his final year of eligibility. While the tournament would later be rescheduled for the summer, Guhle was unable to participate due to injury.

Career statistics

Regular season and playoffs

International

Awards and achievements

References

External links
 

2002 births
Living people
Canadian ice hockey defencemen
Edmonton Oil Kings players
Ice hockey people from Alberta
Laval Rocket players
Montreal Canadiens draft picks
Montreal Canadiens players
National Hockey League first-round draft picks
Prince Albert Raiders players
People from Sherwood Park